The Speaker of Arunachal Pradesh Legislative Assembly is the presiding officer in Arunachal Pradesh Legislative Assembly.

Powers and functions 
Speaker and Deputy Speaker of Arunachal Pradesh Legislative Assembly cannot be disqualified for being chosen. The Speaker can nominate or discharge any Member from any committee. The Speaker is the Chairman of Business Advisory Committee in Arunachal Pradesh Legislative Assembly. The Speaker can adjourn the house when there is no quorum.

Election 
The election of a Speaker is necessary when a new assembly is formed or if the office is vacant. The election is held on a fixed date which is issued by the Governor of Arunachal Pradesh. The election is held before 3:30 PM.

List of Speakers 
The Speakers of Arunachal Pradesh Legislative Assembly are :-

References 

Arunachal Pradesh Legislative Assembly
Speakers of the Arunachal Pradesh Legislative Assembly
Deputy Speakers of the Arunachal Pradesh Legislative Assembly
Government of Arunachal Pradesh
Lists of legislative speakers in India